Gangapur is one of the six constituencies of the Maharashtra Legislative Assembly, that are located in the Aurangabad district.

It is a part of the Aurangabad (Lok Sabha constituency) along with five other assembly constituencies, viz Vaijapur Assembly constituency, Kannad Assembly constituency, Aurangabad East Assembly constituency, Aurangabad Central Assembly constituency and Aurangabad West Assembly constituency.
One of the 288 assembly constituencies of Maharashtra, Gangapur belongs to Aurangabad parliamentary constituency. Having population of 358,155, according to 2011 census, Gangapur is a taluka in Aurangabad district of Maharashtra.

In 2019 General Maharashtra Assembly Election,  Prashant Bansilal Bamb of Bharatiya Janata Party candidate won the assembly elections. Prashant Bansilal Bamb defeated Santosh Annasaheb Mane Patil, rebellion of Shiv Sena. Prashant Bansilal Bamb received 1,07,193 votes as against Santosh Mane's 72,222 votes.
Voters of Gangapur Constituency supported Development agenda of Prashant Bansilal Bamb and his works towards Farmer's empowerment.
Caste politics (caste polarisation) didn't supported by voters of Gangapur constituency to Santosh Mane of NCP and Result of that he lost by huge margin of 34,971 votes.

Bamb Prashant Bansilal from Bharatiya Janata Party won the seat in 2014 by defeating the Ambadas Eknath Danve of Shiv Sena candidate by a margin of 17,278 votes. Bamb Prashant Bansilal got 55,483 votes while Ambadas Eknath Danve SS candidate received 38,205 votes. The Bharatiya Janata Party got 30.11% vote share.

Prashant Bansilal Bamb, an independent candidate won the assembly elections of 2009. He defeated Annasaheb Mane Patil of Shiv Sena, the 2004 elections winner. Bamb received 53067 votes as against Patil's 29568 votes.

Members of Legislative Assembly
 1962  Yamajirao Mhatarrao Satpute Indian National Congress
 1967   Babasaheb Ramrao Pawar  Indian National Congress
 1972   Babasaheb Ramrao Pawar Indian National Congress
 1978: Laxman Eknath Manal, Indian National Congress
 1980: Ashok Rajaram Patil, Indian National Congress
 1985: Kisanrao Kasane, Indian Congress (Socialist)
 1990: Kailash  Patil, Shiv Sena
 1995: Ashok Rajaram Patil, Independent (politician)
 1999: Annasaheb Mane Patil, Shiv Sena
 2004: Annasaheb Mane Patil, Shiv Sena
 2009: Prashant Bansilal Bamb, Independent (politician)
 2014: Prashant Bansilal Bamb, Bharatiya Janata Party
 2019:  Prashant Bansilal Bamb, Bharatiya Janata Party

Election results

Assembly Elections 2004

Assembly Elections 2009

Assembly Elections 2014

Assembly Elections 2019

References

Assembly constituencies of Maharashtra
Aurangabad district, Maharashtra
Year of establishment missing